Schmidbauer is a German occupational surname for a farmer who was also a blacksmith. Notable people with this name include:
Bernd Schmidbauer (born 1939), former German politician and member of the Christian Democratic Union of Germany (CDU)
Iris Schmidbauer (born 1986), German high diver
Maximilian Schmidbauer (born 2001), Austrian cyclist

References

German-language surnames
Occupational surnames